William H. Copeland (July 30, 1848 – 1931) was a brakeman, porter, gauger, deputy sheriff, cafe owner, undertaker, and state legislator in Ohio. He was born in Columbus, Ohio. He served in the Ohio House of Representatives from 1888 to 1889. His photograph is part of the Ohio House of Representatives Photograph Collection.

References

1848 births
1931 deaths
Politicians from Columbus, Ohio
Members of the Ohio House of Representatives